Kountouriotika is a small neighborhood of Athens, Greece, named after the admiral and later  President of Greece Pavlos Kountouriotis. It is located within Ampelokipoi.

References

Neighbourhoods in Athens